The 2015 Alberta general election was held on May 5, 2015, following a request of Premier Jim Prentice to the Lieutenant Governor of Alberta Donald Ethell to dissolve the Legislative Assembly on April 7, 2015. This election elected members to the 29th Alberta Legislature. It was only the fourth time in provincial history that saw a change of government, and was the last provincial election for both the Alberta Progressive Conservative and Wildrose Parties, which would merge in 2017 to form the United Conservative Party (although each would run a token candidate in the 2019 election).

The provincial Election Act fixed the election date to a three-month period between March 1 and May 31 in the fourth calendar year after the preceding election day – in this case, April 23, 2012. However, the Act does not affect the powers of the Lieutenant Governor to dissolve the Legislature before this period.

As a result of the election, the Alberta New Democratic Party (NDP) were elected to a majority government under leader Rachel Notley. The NDP formed Government for the first time in Alberta history, ousting the PCs, who were reduced to third place in seats.  Prentice resigned as PC leader and MLA for Calgary-Foothills on election night. 

The Progressive Conservative Association of Alberta (PCs) had a majority in the outgoing Assembly. The Progressive Conservatives had won every provincial election since the 1971 election, making them the longest-serving provincial government in Canadian history—being in office for 44 years. This was only the fourth change of government in Alberta since Alberta became a province in 1905, and one of the worst defeats a provincial government has suffered in Canada. It also marked the first time in almost 80 years that a left-of-centre political party had formed government in Alberta since the defeat of the United Farmers of Alberta in 1935 and the Depression-era radical monetary reform policies of William Aberhart's Social Credit government.

The Wildrose Party under leader Brian Jean remained the Official Opposition, gaining four seats since 2012 despite winning 81,814 fewer votes and a 10.1% lower share of the popular vote than in the previous election. The Alberta Liberal Party and Alberta Party each won a single seat with Alberta Party leader Greg Clark becoming the party's first MLA. The Alberta Liberal Party lost four seats, only returning interim leader David Swann to the Legislative Assembly.

The election is sometimes called the "Orange Chinook", a reference to the province's dramatic swing to the NDP, the NDP's orange colour and the weather shifts occasioned by strong "winds of change" that southern Alberta commonly experiences.

Following the election, Notley and her cabinet were sworn in on May 24, 2015.

Background

In the 2012 general election the PCs lost a portion of their caucus, but were able to continue as majority government, despite their share of the popular vote decreasing to under 50%. The Wildrose Party formed the official opposition for the first time, while the other two parties in the Assembly, the Alberta Liberal Party and Alberta New Democratic Party (NDP), both held official party status with five and four seats respectively. On September 4, 2014, the PCs became the longest serving political dynasty in Canadian history, at 43 years, 5 days.

Prentice, who succeeded former premier and interim leader of the Progressive Conservatives Dave Hancock in September 2014, was not obligated to call an election until 2016. However, seeking a new mandate to pass his budget, he asked Lieutenant Governor Donald Ethell to dissolve the legislature on April 7. In accordance with Canadian constitutional practice, Ethell granted the request, beginning a month long campaign. The early election call was criticized by some as unethical, as it violated the fixed election dates specified in the Elections Act, but it was constitutionally valid and followed the general practice of the reserve powers of the Crown, specifically the constitutional convention of following the advice of the premier.

Results
The NDP received the most votes (more votes than any other party) overall and in 54 districts (more than half the districts). It though did not receive a majority of the vote overall nor in many districts. It received 40.6 percent of the vote and captured 62 percent of the seats in the Legislature.

Due to First-past-the-post voting, the NDP swept the Edmonton seats, won a majority of the seats in Calgary and just less than half of seats in rural Alberta. NDP MLAs were elected in all 21 Edmonton districts, 15 of the 26 Calgary districts and 18 of the 40 districts outside the major cities.

NDP candidates received over 50% of the votes in each Edmonton riding as well as the ridings of Sherwood Park, St. Albert and Lethbridge-West. All opposition (non-NDP) candidates received less than half the votes in the riding where they ran, except for the Wildrose candidates in Cypress-Medicine Hat, Strathmore-Brooks and Olds-Disbury, each of whom captured a majority of the district votes.

The election produced some very close races and small leads for some winning candidates. In Calgary Glenmore the winning candidate won with a lead of six votes over her leading contender. In Calgary McCall an NDP candidate won with less than 30 percent of the vote; in Calgary Shaw an NDP candidate won with but 31 percent of the vote; in Calgary South-East a PC won with only 32.5 percent of the votes cast.

In many ridings the combined votes of the Progressive Conservative and the Wildrose candidates surpassed that of the NDP.

In some ridings such as Red Deer North, Spruce Grove-St. Albert, Calgary-Buffalo, Calgary-Varsity, Lethbridge East and Lethbridge West, the combined vote of the NDP and the Liberal candidates totalled more than 50 percent of the district's votes, thus overwhelming the combined vote of the Conservative and Wild Rose candidate. This also held true for Calgary Mountain View where a Liberal was elected.

In many ridings no Liberal ran, which probably aided the NDP victory in those ridings. These included Lesser Slave Lake, Peace River, Edmonton-McClung, Sherwood Park, West Yellowhead and Whitecourt.

!rowspan="2" colspan="2" style="text-align:left;" |Party
!rowspan="2" style="text-align:left;" |Party leader
!rowspan="2" style="text-align:center;" |Number ofcandidates
!colspan="4" style="text-align:center;" |Seats
!colspan="3" style="text-align:center;" |Popular vote*
|-
| style="text-align:center;" |2012
| style="text-align:center;" |Dissol.
| style="text-align:center;" |2015
| style="text-align:center;" |% of Seats
| style="text-align:center;" |#
| style="text-align:center;" |%
| style="text-align:center;" |Change (pp)

| style="text-align:left;" | Rachel Notley
|87 ||4 ||4 ||54 ||62.1 ||604,518 ||40.62 ||+30.77

| style="text-align:left;" | Brian Jean
|86  ||17 ||5 ||21 ||24.1 ||360,511 ||24.22 ||–10.06

| style="text-align:left;" | Jim Prentice
|87 ||61 ||70 ||9 ||10.3 ||413,610 ||27.79 ||–16.17

| style="text-align:left;" | David Swann
|56 ||5 ||5 ||1 ||1.1 ||62,153 ||4.18 ||–5.71

| style="text-align:left;" |Greg Clark
|36 ||— ||— ||1 ||1.1 ||33,221 ||2.23 ||+0.92

| style="text-align:left;" |Janet Keeping
|24 ||— ||— ||— ||— ||7,215 ||0.48 ||+0.09

| style="text-align:left;" |Len Skowronski
|6 ||— ||— ||— ||— ||834 ||0.06 ||+0.03

| style="text-align:left;" |Naomi Rankin
|2 ||— ||— ||— ||— ||182 ||0.01 ||=

| style="text-align:left;" |Bart Hampton
|1 ||— ||— ||— ||— ||72 ||0.005 ||=

| style="text-align:left;" colspan=2 |Independent
|15 ||— ||1 ||— ||— ||5,932 ||0.40 ||+0.13

| style="text-align:left;" colspan="4" |Vacant
|2
|1**
|1.1
|colspan=3|
|-
| style="text-align:left;" colspan="3" |Total
!400 !!87 !!87 !!87 !!100.0% !!1,488,248 !!100.00% !!
|}
* The total popular vote includes votes from voided Calgary-Foothills election.
** Incumbent Premier Jim Prentice disclaimed his victory in Calgary-Foothills. According to section 139 of the Alberta Elections Act, if a winning candidate disclaims their right to become an MLA before the end of the appeal period for the official results, that riding's election is declared void.

The election resulted in a majority government led by the New Democratic Party.

The result in Calgary-Glenmore remained unresolved on election night, as incumbent PC MLA Linda Johnson and NDP challenger Anam Kazim finished the vote count in an exact tie of 7,015 votes each, necessitating a recount process. On May 15, the recount determined NDP candidate Anam Kazim won the riding by six votes.

The Alberta NDP had been leading in most polls since late April. They had been expected to do well in Edmonton, which historically had been more favourable to centre-left parties and candidates than Alberta in general. However, in a result that exceeded even the most optimistic projections for the NDP, Edmonton swung dramatically to support Notley, who represents an Edmonton riding. The NDP took every seat in the city, all by very large margins (4,000 votes or more with absolute majority support). The NDP also won 15 of the 25 seats in Calgary, the power base of the PCs for most of the previous four decades. The NDP also swept the province's third and fourth-largest cities, Lethbridge and Red Deer. NDP support remained relatively lower in rural Alberta, where they won only a handful of ridings in the north of the province, as well as some rural ridings around Edmonton.

Notley later said that she had known a week before the election that the NDP would win. She told the Canadian Press that she had been sitting in a hotel room in either Calgary or Lethbridge when she saw a very credible poll showing the NDP was poised to rebound from a mere four seats in the legislature – the minimum for official party status – to an outright majority. She was stunned at first, but recovered long enough to drop her plans for a whirlwind schedule to close out the campaign. Her original plan would have not only resulted in her looking extremely haggard in her first speech as premier-elect, but would have left her without time to begin a transition.

The PCs finished second in the popular vote, 53,099 votes ahead of the Wildrose. However, their caucus was decimated due to a near-total collapse in the major cities, as well as a more pronounced split in the right-of-centre vote. They were completely shut out in Edmonton, Lethbridge, and Red Deer, and lost 12 of their 20 seats in Calgary.  Since the first-past-the-post system awards seats solely on the basis of plurality district contests (not by proportional representation), the PCs were knocked down to third place with 10 seats, and only two outside Calgary. This was further reduced to nine when Prentice disclaimed victory in his riding. The PCs were reduced to their smallest presence in the Legislative Assembly since 1967. With a few exceptions, their support in the cities transferred to the NDP, while their rural support moved to the Wildrose. All but three members of Prentice's cabinet were defeated.

The Wildrose had its legislative caucus greatly reduced in 2014 when then-leader and Leader of the Official Opposition Danielle Smith and all but 5 Wildrose MLAs crossed the floor to sit with the governing PCs. In the 2015 general election, the party rebounded to 21 seats and retained Official Opposition status. All of their gains were in rural ridings taken from the PCs, and they failed to win a seat in Edmonton or Calgary.

Greg Clark, leader of the Alberta Party, won the first ever seat for his party in the Legislative Assembly. He won a seats in Calgary.

For the first time the NDP won a majority of seats in Calgary, taking 15 of the city's 26 seats. This centre-left success was deepened by a Liberal candidate and an Alberta Party candidate also scoring wins in that city. Such had not happened since 1921, when Labour candidates and Independents took seats there.

Results by riding
Bold indicates cabinet members, and party leaders are italicized. Candidate names appear as they appeared on the ballot.

Colour band in gulley indictes winner of the election.

All results are sourced from Elections Alberta.

Northern Alberta

|-
| style="background:whitesmoke;"|Athabasca-Sturgeon-Redwater
| ||Jeff Johnson5,016 - 29.9%
| ||Travis Olson4,973 - 29.6%
| ||
|| ||Colin Piquette6,797 - 40.5%
| ||
| ||
||
|Jeff Johnson
|-
| style="background:whitesmoke;"|Barrhead-Morinville-Westlock
| ||Maureen Kubinec4,876 - 26.6%
|| ||Glenn van Dijken7,206 - 39.3%
| ||
| ||Tristan Turner6,232 - 34.0%
| ||
| ||
||
|Maureen Kubinec
|-
| style="background:whitesmoke;"|Bonnyville-Cold Lake
| ||Craig Copeland3,594 - 30.4%
|| ||Scott Cyr5,452 - 46.2%
| ||
| ||Josalyne Head2,136 - 18.1%
| ||Rob Fox628 - 5.3%
| ||
||
|Genia Leskiw†
|-
| style="background:whitesmoke;"|Dunvegan-Central Peace-Notley
| ||Rhonda Clarke-Gauthier2,766 - 28.8%
| ||Kelly Hudson3,147 - 32.8%
| ||
|| ||Margaret McCuaig-Boyd3,692 - 38.4%
| ||
| ||
||
|Hector Goudreau†
|-
| style="background:whitesmoke;"|Fort McMurray-Conklin
| ||Don Scott1,502 - 22.3%
|| ||Brian Jean2,950 - 43.9%
| ||Melinda Hollis204 - 3.0%
| ||Ariana Mancini2,071 - 30.8%
| ||
| ||
||
|Don Scott
|-
| style="background:whitesmoke;"|Fort McMurray-Wood Buffalo
| ||Mike Allen2,486 - 25.9%
|| ||Tany Yao3,835 - 40.0%
| ||Robin Le Fevre345 - 3.6%
| ||Stephen Drover2,915 - 30.4%
| ||
| ||
||
|Mike Allen
|-
| style="background:whitesmoke;"|Grande Prairie-Smoky
| ||Everett McDonald4,968 - 30.8%
|| ||Todd Loewen5,343 - 33.2%
| ||Kevin McLean787 - 4.9%
| ||Todd Russell5,009 - 31.1%
| ||
| ||
||
|Everett McDonald
|-
| style="background:whitesmoke;"|Grande Prairie-Wapiti
|| ||Wayne Drysdale6,229 - 35.6%
| ||Laila Goodridge4,175 - 23.8%
| ||
| ||Mary Dahr5,062 - 28.9%
| ||Rory Tarant2,048 - 11.7%
| ||
||
|Wayne Drysdale
|-
| style="background:whitesmoke;"|Lac La Biche-St. Paul-Two Hills
| ||Darrell Younghans3,004 - 24.4%
|| ||David Hanson4,763 - 38.7%
| ||
| ||Catherine Harder4,214 - 34.2%
| ||
| ||Brian Deheer (Green)339 - 2.8%
||
|Shayne Saskiw†
|-
| style="background:whitesmoke;"|Lesser Slave Lake
| ||Pearl Calahasen1,944 - 21.5%
| ||Darryl Boisson3,198 - 35.3%
| ||
|| ||Danielle Larivee3,915 - 43.2%
| ||
| ||
||
|Pearl Calahasen
|-
| style="background:whitesmoke;"|Peace River
| ||Frank Oberle3,529 - 36.4%
| ||Nathan Steinke1,979 - 20.4%
| ||
|| ||Debbie Jabbour3,821 - 39.4%
| ||Sherry Hilton376 - 3.9%
| ||
||
|Frank Oberle

Central Edmonton

|-
| style="background:whitesmoke;"|Edmonton-Beverly-Clareview
| ||Tony Caterina2,524 - 15.5%
| ||Stephanie Diacon1,248 - 7.6%
| ||Tomi Yellowface359 - 2.2%
|| ||Deron Bilous12,049 - 73.8%
| ||Owais Siddiqui147 - 0.9%
| ||
||
|Deron Bilous
|-
| style="background:whitesmoke;"|Edmonton-Calder
| ||Thomas "Tom" Bradley3,222 - 17.8%
| ||Andrew Altimas1,565 - 8.6%
| ||Amit "Sunny" Batra527 - 2.9%
|| ||David Eggen12,837 - 70.7%
| ||
| ||
||
|David Eggen
|-
| style="background:whitesmoke;"|Edmonton-Centre
| ||Catherine Keill2,228 - 13.5%
| ||Joe Byram772 - 4.7%
| ||Laurie Blakeman4,199 - 25.4%
|| ||David Shepherd8,983 - 54.4%
| ||
| ||Greg Keating (Ind.)295 - 1.8%Rory Joe Koopmans (Ind.)40 - 0.2%
||
|Laurie Blakeman
|-
| style="background:whitesmoke;"|Edmonton-Glenora
| ||Heather Klimchuk3,145 - 17.3%
| ||Don Koziak1,394 - 7.6%
| ||Karen Sevcik553 - 3.0%
|| ||Sarah Hoffman12,473 - 68.4%
| ||Chris Vilcsak463 - 2.5%
| ||David Parker (Green)195 - 1.1%
||
|Heather Klimchuk
|-
| style="background:whitesmoke;"|Edmonton-Gold Bar
| ||David Dorward4,147 - 18.6%
| ||Justin J. James1,422 - 6.4%
| ||Ronald Brochu702 - 3.2%
|| ||Marlin Schmidt15,349 - 68.9%
| ||Cristina Stasia662 - 3.0%
| ||
||
|David Dorward
|-
| style="background:whitesmoke;"|Edmonton-Highlands-Norwood
| ||Jonathan Weiqun Dai1,778 - 12.0%
| ||Joshua Loeppky967 - 6.5%
| ||Matthew R. Smith494 - 3.3%
|| ||Brian Mason11,555 - 78.1%
| ||
| ||
||
|Brian Mason
|-
| style="background:whitesmoke;"|Edmonton-Mill Creek
| ||Gene Zwozdesky3,848 - 23.9%
| ||Saqib Raja1,365 - 8.5%
| ||Harpreet Gill1,896 - 11.8%
|| ||Denise Woollard9,025 - 55.9%
| ||
| ||
||
|Gene Zwozdesky
|-
| style="background:whitesmoke;"|Edmonton-Mill Woods
| ||Sohail Quadri2,920 - 19.1%
| ||Baljit Sall1,437 - 9.4%
| ||Roberto Maglalang850 - 5.6%
|| ||Christina Gray9,930 - 64.9%
| ||
| ||Aura Leddy (Ind.)129 - 0.8%Naomi Rankin(Communist)44 - 0.3%
||
|Sohail Quadri
|-
| style="background:whitesmoke;"|Edmonton-Riverview
| ||Steve Young3,732 - 19.3%
| ||Ian Crawford1,350 - 7.0%
| ||Donna Wilson1,416 - 7.3%
|| ||Lori Sigurdson12,108 - 62.8%
| ||Brandon Beringer487 - 2.5%
| ||Sandra Wolf Lange (Green)135 - 0.7%Glenn Miller (Ind.)59 - 0.3%
||
|Steve Young
|-
| style="background:whitesmoke;"|Edmonton-Rutherford
| ||Chris LaBossiere3,940 - 22.5%
| ||Josef Pisa1,644 - 9.4%
| ||Michael Chan741 - 4.2%
|| ||Richard Feehan11,214 - 63.9%
| ||
| ||
||
|Fred Horne†
|-
| style="background:whitesmoke;"|Edmonton-Strathcona
| ||Shelley Wegner2,242 - 13.6%
| ||
| ||Steve Kochan658 - 4.0%
|| ||Rachel Notley13,592 - 82.4%
| ||
| ||
||
|Rachel Notley

Suburban Edmonton

|-
| style="background:whitesmoke;"|Edmonton-Castle Downs
| ||Thomas Lukaszuk4,182 - 23.1%
| ||Gerrit Roosenboom1,383 - 7.6%
| ||Todd Ross880 - 4.9%
|| ||Nicole Goehring11,689 - 64.5%
| ||
| ||
||
|Thomas Lukaszuk
|-
| style="background:whitesmoke;"|Edmonton-Decore
| ||Janice Sarich2,847 - 18.4%
| ||Dean R. Miller1,289 - 8.3%
| ||Bradley Lawrence Whalen691 - 4.5%
|| ||Chris Nielsen10,531 - 67.9%
| ||
| ||Trey Capnerhurst (Green)150 - 1.0%
||
|Janice Sarich
|-
| style="background:whitesmoke;"|Edmonton-Ellerslie
| ||Harman Kandola3,549 - 19.8%
| ||Jackie Lovely2,499 - 13.9%
| ||Mike McGowan839 - 4.7%
|| ||Rod Loyola11,034 - 61.6%
| ||
| ||
||
|Naresh Bhardwaj§
|-
|style="background:whitesmoke;"|Edmonton-Manning
| ||Gurcharan Garcha2,599 - 15.1%
| ||Atiq Rehman1,475 - 8.6%
| ||Adam Mounzer776 - 4.5%
|| ||Heather Sweet12,376 - 71.8%
| ||
| ||
||
|Peter Sandhu§
|-
| style="background:whitesmoke;"|Edmonton-McClung
| ||David Xiao4,408 - 25.9%
| ||Steve Thompson2,373 - 14.0%
| ||
|| ||Lorne Dach9,412 - 55.4%
| ||John Hudson808 - 4.8%
| ||
||
|David Xiao
|-
| style="background:whitesmoke;"|Edmonton-Meadowlark
| ||Katherine O'Neill3,924 - 22.8%
| ||Amber Maze1,972 - 11.5%
| ||Dan Bildhauer1,507 - 8.8%
|| ||Jon Carson9,796 - 57.0%
| ||
| ||
||
|Raj Sherman†
|-
| style="background:whitesmoke;"|Edmonton-South West
| ||Matt Jeneroux6,316 - 27.8%
| ||Cole Kander2,290 - 10.1%
| ||Rudy Arcilla1,199 - 5.3%
|| ||Thomas Dang12,352 - 54.4%
| ||Krishna Tailor543 - 2.4%
| ||
||
|Matt Jeneroux
|-
| style="background:whitesmoke;"|Edmonton-Whitemud
| ||Stephen Mandel7,177 - 32.2%
| ||Chad Peters1,423 - 6.4%
| ||Steven Townsend629 - 2.8%
|| ||Bob Turner12,805 - 57.4%
| ||
| ||Kathryn Jackson (Green)182 - 0.8%John Baloun (Ind.)73 - 0.3%
||
|Stephen Mandel
|-
|style="background:whitesmoke;"|Sherwood Park
| ||Cathy Olesen5,655 - 25.9%
| ||Linda Osinchuk4,815 - 22.1%
| ||
|| ||Annie McKitrick11,365 - 52.0%
| ||
| ||
||
|Cathy Olesen
|-
| style="background:whitesmoke;"|St. Albert
| ||Stephen Khan6,340 - 27.9%
| ||Shelley Biermanski2,858 - 12.6%
| ||Bill Alton778 - 3.4%
|| ||Marie Renaud12,220 - 53.9%
| ||Trevor Love493 - 2.2%
| ||
||
|Stephen Khan

West Central Alberta

|-
| style="background:whitesmoke;"|Drayton Valley-Devon
| ||Diana J. McQueen5,182 - 30.5%
|| ||Mark Smith6,284 - 37.0%
| ||
| ||Katherine Swampy4,816 - 28.4%
| ||Connie Jensen416 - 2.5%
| ||Jennifer R. Roach (Green)276 - 1.6%
||
|Diana McQueen
|-
| style="background:whitesmoke;"|Innisfail-Sylvan Lake
| ||Kerry Towle5,136 - 28.0%
|| ||Don MacIntyre7,829 - 42.7%
| ||
| ||Patricia Norman4,244 - 23.1%
| ||Danielle Klooster1,135 - 6.2%
| ||
||
|Kerry Towle
|-
| style="background:whitesmoke;"|Olds-Didsbury-Three Hills
| ||Wade Bearchell5,274 - 26.3%
|| ||Nathan Cooper10,692 - 53.4%
| ||
| ||Glenn R. Norman3,366 - 16.8%
| ||Jim Adamchick685 - 3.4%
| ||
||
|Bruce Rowe†
|-
| style="background:whitesmoke;"|Red Deer-North
| ||Christine Moore3,836 - 22.7%
| ||S.H. "Buck" Buchanan4,173 - 24.7%
| ||Michael Dawe3,262 - 19.3%
|| ||Kim Schreiner4,969 - 29.4%
| ||Krystal Kromm683 - 4.0%
| ||
||
|Mary Anne Jablonski†
|-
| style="background:whitesmoke;"|Red Deer-South
| ||Darcy Mykytyshyn5,414 - 27.6%
| ||Norman Wiebe4,812 - 24.6%
| ||Deborah Checkel738 - 3.8%
|| ||Barb Miller7,024 - 35.9%
| ||Serge Gingras1,035 - 5.3%
| ||Ben Dubois (Green)274 - 1.4%Patti Argent (Ind.)232 - 1.2%William Berry (Ind.)60 - 0.3%
||
|Cal Dallas†
|-
| style="background:whitesmoke;"|Rimbey-Rocky Mountain House-Sundre
| ||Tammy Coté5,296 - 31.8%
|| ||Jason Nixon6,670 - 40.1%
| ||
| ||Hannah Schlamp2,791 - 16.8%
| ||
| ||Joe Anglin (Ind.)1,871 - 11.3%
||
|Joe Anglin
|-
| style="background:whitesmoke;"|Spruce Grove-St. Albert
| ||Rus Matichuk6,362 - 25.6%
| ||Jaye Walter4,631 - 18.7%
| ||Reg Lukasik916 - 3.7%
|| ||Trevor Horne11,546 - 46.5%
| ||Gary Hanna1,081 - 4.4%
| ||Brendon Greene (Green)269 - 1.1%
||
|Vacant
|-
| style="background:whitesmoke;"|Stony Plain
| ||Ken Lemke4,944 - 25.7%
| ||Kathy Rondeau5,586 - 29.1%
| ||Mike Hanlon657 - 3.4%
|| ||Erin Babcock7,268 - 37.8%
| ||Sandy Simmie538 - 2.8%
| ||Matt Burnett (Green)220 - 1.1%
||
|Ken Lemke
|-
| style="background:whitesmoke;"|West Yellowhead
| ||Robin Campbell3,433 - 32.3%
| ||Stuart Taylor3,055 - 28.8%
| ||
|| ||Eric Rosendahl4,135 - 38.9%
| ||
| ||
||
|Robin Campbell
|-
| style="background:whitesmoke;"|Whitecourt-Ste. Anne
| ||George VanderBurg4,721 - 31.1%
| ||John Bos4,996 - 33.0%
| ||
|| ||Oneil Carlier5,442 - 35.9%
| ||
| ||
||
|George VanderBurg

East Central Alberta

|-
| style="background:whitesmoke;"|Battle River-Wainwright
| ||Blake Prior5,057 - 31.2%
|| ||Wes Taylor6,862 - 42.3%
| ||Ron Williams500 - 3.1%
| ||Gordon Naylor3,807 - 23.5%
| ||
| ||
||
|Vacant
|-
| style="background:whitesmoke;"|Drumheller-Stettler
| ||Jack Hayden5,388 - 33.9%
|| ||Rick Strankman7,570 - 47.7%
| ||
| ||Emily Shannon2,927 - 18.4%
| ||
| ||
||
|Rick Strankman
|-
|style="background:whitesmoke;"|Fort Saskatchewan-Vegreville
| ||Jacquie Fenske5,527 - 28.3%
| ||Joe Gosselin3,959 - 20.2%
| ||Peter Schneider475 - 2.4%
|| ||Jessica Littlewood8,983 - 45.9%
| ||Derek Christensen324 - 1.7%
| ||Allison Anderson (Green)285 - 1.5%
||
|Jacquie Fenske
|-
| style="background:whitesmoke;"|Lacombe-Ponoka
| ||Peter Dewit5,018 - 27.6%
|| ||Ron Orr6,502 - 35.7%
| ||
| ||Doug Hart5,481 - 30.1%
| ||Tony Jeglum1,206 - 6.6%
| ||
||
|Rod Fox§
|-
| style="background:whitesmoke;"|Leduc-Beaumont
| ||George Rogers6,225 - 28.3%
| ||Sharon Smith6,543 - 29.7%
| ||
|| ||Shaye Anderson8,321 - 37.8%
| ||Bert Hoogewoonink612 - 2.8%
| ||Josh Drozda (Green)301 - 1.4%
||
|George Rogers
|-
| style="background:whitesmoke;"|Strathcona-Sherwood Park
| ||Dave Quest6,623 - 30.1%
| ||Rob Johnson5,286 - 24.0%
| ||
|| ||Estefania Cortes-Vargas9,376 - 42.6%
| ||Lynne Kaiser721 - 3.3%
| ||
||
|Dave Quest
|-
| style="background:whitesmoke;"|Vermilion-Lloydminster
|| ||Richard Starke5,935 - 47.4%
| ||Danny Hozack4,171 - 33.3%
| ||
| ||Saba Mossagizi2,428 - 19.4%
| ||
| ||
||
|Richard Starke
|-
| style="background:whitesmoke;"|Wetaskiwin-Camrose
| ||Verlyn Olson5,951 - 34.7%
| ||Bill Rock3,685 - 21.5%
| ||
|| ||Bruce Hinkley7,531 - 43.9%
| ||
| ||
||
|Verlyn Olson

Central Calgary

|-
| style="background:whitesmoke;"|Calgary-Acadia
| ||Jonathan Denis4,602 - 29.0%
| ||Linda Carlson4,985 - 31.4%
| ||Nicholas Borovsky765 - 4.8%
|| ||Brandy Payne5,506 - 34.7%
| ||
| ||
||
|Jonathan Denis
|-
| style="background:whitesmoke;"|Calgary-Buffalo
| ||Terry Rock3,738 - 28.1%
| ||Leah Wamboldt1,351 - 10.2%
| ||David Khan3,282 - 24.7%
|| ||Kathleen Ganley4,671 - 35.1%
| ||
| ||Sabrina Lee Levac (Green)263 - 2.0%
||
|Kent Hehr†
|-
| style="background:whitesmoke;"|Calgary-Cross
| ||Rick Hanson4,501 - 35.3%
| ||Moiz Mahmood2,060 - 16.2%
| ||Manjot Singh Gill1,194 - 9.4%
|| ||Ricardo Miranda4,602 - 36.1%
| ||
| ||Peter Meic (Green)236 - 1.9%Katherine Le Rougetel (Ind.)143 - 1.1%
||
|Yvonne Fritz†
|-
| style="background:whitesmoke;"|Calgary-Currie
| ||Christine Cusanelli4,577 - 24.7%
| ||Terry DeVries3,769 - 20.3%
| ||Shelley Wark-Martyn1,441 - 7.8%
|| ||Brian Malkinson7,387 - 39.8%
| ||Tony Norman1,006 - 5.4%
| ||Nelson Berlin (Green)373 - 2.0%
||
|Christine Cusanelli
|-
| style="background:whitesmoke;"|Calgary-East
| ||Moe Amery3,971 - 28.3%
| ||Ali Waissi3,633 - 25.9%
| ||Naser Al-Kukhun806 - 5.7%
|| ||Robyn Luff5,506 - 39.2%
| ||
| ||Bonnie Devine (Communist)138 - 1.0%
||
|Moe Amery
|-
| style="background:whitesmoke;"|Calgary-Elbow
| ||Gordon Dirks6,254 - 30.3%
| ||Megan Brown1,786 - 8.7%
| ||John Roggeveen565 - 2.7%
| ||Catherine Welburn3,256 - 15.8%
|| ||Greg Clark8,707 - 42.2%
| ||Larry R. Heather (Social Credit)67 - 0.3%
||
|Gordon Dirks
|-
| style="background:whitesmoke;"|Calgary-Fish Creek
|| ||Richard Gotfried6,198 - 32.9%
| ||Blaine Maller5,568 - 29.6%
| ||
| ||Jill Moreton6,069 - 32.2%
| ||Allison Wemyss850 - 4.5%
| ||Martin Owen (Social Credit)148 - 0.8%
||
|Heather Forsyth†
|-
| style="background:whitesmoke;"|Calgary-Fort
| ||Andy Bao Nguyen3,204 - 22.7%
| ||Jeevan Mangat3,003 - 21.3%
| ||Said Abdulbaki476 - 3.4%
|| ||Joe Ceci7,027 - 49.8%
| ||Vic Goosen410 - 2.9%
| ||
||
|Wayne Cao†
|-
| style="background:whitesmoke;"|Calgary-Glenmore
| ||Linda Johnson7,015 - 33.2%
| ||Chris Kemp-Jackson5,058 - 23.9%
| ||David Waddington1,345 - 6.4%
|| ||Anam Kazim7,021 - 33.2%
| ||Terry Lo719 - 3.4%
| ||
||
|Linda Johnson
|-
| style="background:whitesmoke;"|Calgary-Klein
| ||Kyle Fawcett4,878 - 26.8%
| ||Jeremy Nixon4,206 - 23.0%
| ||David Gamble1,104 - 6.0%
|| ||Craig Coolahan8,098 - 44.3%
| ||
| ||Noel Keough (Green)0 - 0.0%
||
|Kyle Fawcett
|-
| style="background:whitesmoke;"|Calgary-Mountain View
| ||Mark Hlady4,699 - 23.9%
| ||Terry Wong2,070 - 10.5%
|| ||David Swann7,204 - 36.7%
| ||Marc Andrew Chikinda5,673 - 28.9%
| ||
| ||
||
|David Swann
|-
| style="background:whitesmoke;"|Calgary-Varsity
| ||Susan Billington5,700 - 30.2%
| ||Sharon Polsky2,598 - 13.8%
| ||Pete Helfrich1,862 - 9.9%
|| ||Stephanie McLean8,297 - 43.9%
| ||
| ||Carl Svoboda (Green)424 - 2.2%
||
|Donna Kennedy-Glans†

Suburban Calgary

|-
| style="background:whitesmoke;"|Calgary-Bow
| ||Byron Nelson5,419 - 33.0%
| ||Trevor Grover3,752 - 22.8%
| ||Matt Gaiser682 - 4.2%
|| ||Deborah Drever5,669 - 34.5%
| ||Jonathon Himann459 - 2.8%
| ||David Reid (Green)448 - 2.7%
||
|Alana DeLong†
|-
| style="background:whitesmoke;"|Calgary-Foothills
|| ||Jim Prentice7,163 - 40.3%
| ||Keelan Frey3,216 - 18.1%
| ||Ali Bin Zahid1,271 - 7.2%
| ||Anne Wilson5,748 - 32.4%
| ||
| ||Janet Keeping (Green)363 - 2.0%
||
|Jim Prentice
|-
| style="background:whitesmoke;"|Calgary-Greenway
|| ||Manmeet Bhullar5,337 - 42.8%
| ||Devinder Toor2,627 - 21.1%
| ||
| ||Don Monroe4,513 - 36.2%
| ||
| ||
||
|Manmeet Bhullar
|-
|style="background:whitesmoke;"|Calgary-Hawkwood
| ||Jason Luan6,378 - 31.2%
| ||Jae Shim4,448 - 21.7%
| ||Harbaksh Singh Sekhon736 - 3.6%
|| ||Michael Connolly7,443 - 36.4%
| ||Beth Barberree925 - 4.5%
| ||Polly Knowlton Cockett (Green)455 - 2.2%Len Skowronski (Social Credit)90 - 0.4%
||
|Jason Luan
|-
| style="background:whitesmoke;"|Calgary-Hays
|| ||Ric McIver6,671 - 38.3%
| ||Bob Mailloux4,562 - 26.2%
| ||Shawn Emran722 - 4.1%
| ||Carla Drader5,138 - 29.5%
| ||
| ||Graham MacKenzie (Green)250 - 1.4%Zachary Doyle (Social Credit)93 - 0.5%
||
|Ric McIver
|-
| style="background:whitesmoke;"|Calgary-Lougheed
|| ||Dave Rodney5,939 - 35.0%
| ||Mark Mantei4,781 - 28.2%
| ||Leila Keith817 - 4.8%
| ||Mihai Ion5,437 - 32.0%
| ||
| ||
||
|Dave Rodney
|-
|style="background:whitesmoke;"|Calgary-Mackay-Nose Hill
| ||Neil Brown4,587 - 27.4%
| ||Kathy Macdonald4,914 - 29.3%
| ||Prab Lashar768 - 4.6%
|| ||Karen M. McPherson6,177 - 36.9%
| ||
| ||Sandy Kevin Aberdeen (Green)316 - 1.9%
||
|Neil Brown
|-
| style="background:whitesmoke;"|Calgary-McCall
| ||Jagdeep Kaur Sahota2,317 - 18.2%
| ||Happy Mann3,367 - 26.4%
| ||Avinash S. Khangura2,224 - 17.5%
|| ||Irfan Sabir3,812 - 29.9%
| ||
| ||Burhan Khan (Ind.)1,010 - 7.9%
||
|Darshan Kang†
|-
| style="background:whitesmoke;"|Calgary-North West
|| ||Sandra Jansen6,320 - 32.7%
| ||Jeff Callaway5,163 - 26.7%
| ||Neil Marion935 - 4.8%
| ||Karen Mills5,724 - 29.6%
| ||Chris Blatch1,176 - 6.1%
| ||
||
|Sandra Jansen
|-
| style="background:whitesmoke;"|Calgary-Northern Hills
| ||Teresa Woo-Paw5,343 - 30.7%
| ||Prasad Panda4,392 - 25.3%
| ||Harry Lin1,000 - 5.8%
|| ||Jamie Kleinsteuber6,641 - 38.2%
| ||
| ||
||
|Teresa Woo-Paw
|-
| style="background:whitesmoke;"|Calgary-Shaw
| ||Jeff Wilson5,348 - 30.7%
| ||Brad Leishman5,301 - 30.4%
| ||Alexander Barrow668 - 3.8%
|| ||Graham Sucha5,449 - 31.2%
| ||Evert Smith661 - 3.8%
| ||
||
|Jeff Wilson
|-
| style="background:whitesmoke;"|Calgary-South East
|| ||Rick Fraser7,663 - 32.5%
| ||Brandon Lunty6,892 - 29.2%
| ||Gladwin Gill1,304 - 5.5%
| ||Mirical Macdonald7,358 - 31.2%
| ||
| ||Jordan Mac Isaac (Green)374 - 1.6%
||
|Rick Fraser
|-
| style="background:whitesmoke;"|Calgary-West
|| ||Mike Ellis8,312 - 46.8%
| ||Gerard Lucyshyn4,512 - 25.4%
| ||
| ||Mizanur Rahman4,940 - 27.8%
| ||
| ||
||
|Mike Ellis
|-
|style="background:whitesmoke;"|Chestermere-Rocky View
| ||Bruce McAllister7,454 - 36.0%
|| ||Leela Sharon Aheer7,676 - 37.0%
| ||
| ||William James Pelech3,706 - 17.9%
| ||
| ||Jamie Lall (Ind.)1,093 - 5.3%Coral Bliss Taylor (Green)405 - 2.0%Matt Grant (Ind.)391 - 1.9%
||
|Bruce McAllister
|-

Southern Alberta

|-
| style="background:whitesmoke;"|Airdrie
| ||Peter Brown6,181 - 28.9%
|| ||Angela Pitt7,499 - 35.1%
| ||
| ||Chris Noble6,388 - 29.9%
| ||Jeremy Klug912 - 4.3%
| ||Jeff Willerton (Ind.)399 - 1.9%
||
|Rob Anderson†
|-
| style="background:whitesmoke;"|Banff-Cochrane
| ||Ron Casey5,555 - 28.2%
| ||Scott Wagner5,692 - 28.9%
| ||
|| ||Cameron Westhead8,426 - 42.8%
| ||
| ||
||
|Ron Casey
|-
| style="background:whitesmoke;"|Cardston-Taber-Warner
| ||Brian Brewin4,356 - 35.5%
|| ||Grant Hunter5,126 - 41.8%
| ||
| ||Aaron Haugen2,407 - 19.6%
| ||Delbert Bodnarek378 - 3.1%
| ||
||
|Gary Bikman§
|-
| style="background:whitesmoke;"|Cypress-Medicine Hat
| ||Bob Olson3,389 - 21.6%
|| ||Drew Barnes8,544 - 54.6%
| ||Eric Musekamp528 - 3.4%
| ||Bev Waege3,201 - 20.4%
| ||
| ||
||
|Drew Barnes
|-
| style="background:whitesmoke;"|Highwood
| ||Carrie Fischer6,827 - 33.0%
|| ||Wayne Anderson8,504 - 41.1%
| ||
| ||Leslie Mahoney3,937 - 19.0%
| ||Joel Windsor892 - 4.3%
| ||Martin Blake (Green)390 - 1.7%Jeremy Fraser (Social Credit)187 - 0.9%
||
|Danielle Smith§
|-
| style="background:whitesmoke;"|Lethbridge-East
| ||Tammy L. Perlich4,743 - 25.3%
| ||Kent Prestage3,918 - 20.9%
| ||Bill West1,201 - 6.4%
|| ||Maria Fitzpatrick8,918 - 47.5%
| ||
| ||
||
|Bridget Pastoor†
|-
| style="background:whitesmoke;"|Lethbridge-West
| ||Greg Weadick3,938 - 21.0%
| ||Ron Bain3,063 - 16.3%
| ||Sheila Pyne634 - 3.4%
|| ||Shannon Phillips11,144 - 59.3%
| ||
| ||
||
|Greg Weadick
|-
| style="background:whitesmoke;"|Little Bow
| ||Ian Donovan4,793 - 35.3%
|| ||David Schneider4,803 - 35.4%
| ||Helen McMenamin377 - 2.8%
| ||Bev Muendel-Atherstone3,364 - 24.8%
| ||
| ||Caleb Van Der Weide (Social Credit)249 - 1.8%
||
|Ian Donovan
|-
| style="background:whitesmoke;"|Livingstone-Macleod
| ||Evan P. Berger6,404 - 34.7%
|| ||Pat Stier7,362 - 39.9%
| ||Alida Hess464 - 2.5%
| ||Aileen Burke4,338 - 22.9%
| ||
| ||
||
|Pat Stier
|-
| style="background:whitesmoke;"|Medicine Hat
| ||Blake Pedersen3,427 - 21.1%
| ||Val Olson5,790 - 35.6%
| ||
|| ||Bob Wanner6,160 - 37.9%
| ||Jim Black731 - 4.5%
| ||David Andrew Phillips (Ind.)137 - 0.8%
||
|Blake Pedersen
|-
| style="background:whitesmoke;"|Strathmore-Brooks
| ||Molly Douglass4,452 - 27.0%
|| ||Derek Fildebrandt8,652 - 52.5%
| ||Ali Abdulbaki200 - 1.2%
| ||Lynn MacWilliam2,463 - 15.0%
| ||Einar B. Davison304 - 1.8%
| ||Mike Worthington (Green)322 - 2.0%Glen Dundas (Alberta First)72 - 0.4%
||
|Jason Hale†

Defeated incumbents

MLAs who did not run again
Progressive Conservative
Rob Anderson, Airdrie
Wayne Cao, Calgary-Fort
Cal Dallas, Red Deer-South
Alana DeLong, Calgary-Bow
Yvonne Fritz, Calgary-Cross
Hector Goudreau, Dunvegan-Central Peace-Notley
Jason Hale, Strathmore-Brooks
Fred Horne, Edmonton-Rutherford
Mary Anne Jablonski, Red Deer-North
Genia Leskiw, Bonnyville-Cold Lake
Donna Kennedy-Glans, Calgary-Varsity
Bridget Pastoor, Lethbridge-East
Bruce Rowe, Olds-Didsbury-Three Hills
Danielle Smith, Highwood

Wildrose
Heather Forsyth, Calgary-Fish Creek
Shayne Saskiw, Lac La Biche-St. Paul-Two Hills

Liberal
Kent Hehr, Calgary-Buffalo
Darshan Kang, Calgary-McCall
Raj Sherman, Edmonton-Meadowlark

Timeline

2012 
April 23: The Progressive Conservative Association of Alberta (PCs) win the 28th Alberta general election. The Wildrose Party wins the second-most seats, for the first time forming the Official Opposition.
May 3:The election results are certified and made official.
May 23: The 28th Alberta Legislative Assembly sits for the first time.

2013 
May 14: The Separation Party of Alberta changes its name back to the Alberta First Party name it abandoned in 2004.
May 14: Edmonton-Manning PC MLA Peter Sandhu resigns from the PC caucus, becoming an Independent.
July 16: Fort McMurray-Wood Buffalo PC MLA Mike Allen quits the PC caucus after being arrested in the US on a soliciting for prostitution charge.
December 10: Edmonton-Manning Independent MLA Peter Sandhu rejoins the PC caucus.

2014 
March 12: After an expense scandal involving Premier Redford's trip to the funeral of Nelson Mandela, Calgary-Foothills PC MLA Len Webber leaves the PC caucus to sit as an Independent.
March 17: Calgary-Varsity PC MLA and Associate Minister for Electricity and Renewable Energy Donna Kennedy-Glans leaves the PC caucus to sit as an Independent.
March 20: Alison Redford resigns as leader of the PCs, and Dave Hancock is named interim leader.
March 23: Redford's resignation as Premier comes into effect and Deputy Premier and Edmonton-Whitemud MLA Dave Hancock is sworn in as Premier.
April 29: An NDP leadership election is initiated when leader Brian Mason announces his pending resignation as leader.
July 7: Fort McMurray-Wood Buffalo Independent MLA Mike Allen is admitted back into the PC caucus after a caucus vote.
August 6: PC MLA Alison Redford resigns her Calgary-Elbow seat, triggering a by-election.
September 6: In the Progressive Conservative Association of Alberta leadership election, former federal cabinet minister Jim Prentice is elected leader.
September 15: Dave Hancock resigns as Premier and his Edmonton-Whitemud seat, triggering a by-election. Jim Prentice is sworn in as premier.
September 17: Calgary-Varsity Independent MLA Donna Kennedy-Glans requests, and is accepted back into, the PC caucus.
September 29: Independent MLA Len Webber resigns his Calgary-Foothills seat, PC MLA Ken Hughes resigns his Calgary-West seat, and by-elections are called in their ridings as well as Calgary-Elbow and Edmonton-Whitemud.
October 18: At the Alberta NDP convention Rachel Notley is chosen party leader.
October 27: Four PC MLAs are elected in by-elections: Gordon Dirks in Calgary-Elbow, Jim Prentice in Calgary-Foothills, Mike Ellis in Calgary-West, and Stephen Mandel in Edmonton-Whitemud.
November 2: Rimbey-Rocky Mountain House-Sundre Wildrose MLA Joe Anglin leaves the Wildrose caucus to sit as an Independent.
November 24: Innisfail-Sylvan Lake MLA Kerry Towle and Little Bow MLA Ian Donovan leave the Wildrose Party and join the PCs.
December 17: Nine Wildrose Party MLAs, including leader Danielle Smith and House Leader Rob Anderson cross the floor to join the PCs.
December 21: Heather Forsyth is named interim leader of the Wildrose Party.

2015 
January 26: Raj Sherman resigns as leader of the Alberta Liberal Party, and PC MLA Doug Griffiths resigns from his Battle River-Wainwright seat.
January 31: PC MLA Doug Horner resigns his Spruce Grove-St. Albert seat.
February 1: David Swann is named interim leader of the Alberta Liberal Party.
March 26: Premier Jim Prentice tables his government's 2015-16 budget.
March 28: Former Conservative MP Brian Jean wins Wildrose Party leadership election, former Wildrose Party leader Danielle Smith loses PC nomination in Highwood to Okotoks councilor Carrie Fischer
April 7: Premier Jim Prentice drops the writ, calling for an election on May 5, 2015.
April 23: Televised leaders' debate.
May 5: Election results - the NDP win a majority of seats (53), and the Wildrose finish second with 21 seats. The Progressive Conservatives' run of nearly 44 years as government ends with a third-place finish of 10 seats. Premier Prentice announces resignation as PC leader and as Calgary-Foothills MLA. The initial result in Calgary-Glenmore is a tie.
May 15: Elections Alberta publishes the official result. NDP candidate Anam Kazim wins the riding of Calgary-Glenmore after recount, leaving the NDP holding 54 of 87 seats in the legislature.

Opinion polls
The following is a summary of published polls of voter intentions.

Media endorsements
The following media outlets endorsed the Progressive Conservatives during the campaign:

 Calgary Herald (Postmedia)
 Calgary Sun (Postmedia)
 The Globe and Mail (The Woodbridge Company, majority owned by Thomson Reuters)
 Edmonton Journal (Postmedia)
 Edmonton Sun (Postmedia)

No media endorsements were made for any of the other parties.

Footnotes

References

References

Works cited

External links
Elections Alberta

Alberta
2015
2015 in Alberta
May 2015 events in Canada